"So You Win Again" is a song by British band Hot Chocolate, released in June 1977 as the lead single from the album Every 1's a Winner.

Written by Russ Ballard and produced by Mickie Most, it is the band's sole UK number one single, spending three weeks at the top in July 1977, and one week as an NME number-one single. The song made it to No. 3 in Australia, No. 6 in Germany, and just missed the top 30 on the Billboard Hot 100 chart in the United States, peaking at No. 31.

Performances
Hot Chocolate performed the song on Top of the Pops.

Charts

Weekly charts

Year-end charts

Certifications

Cover versions
In June 1978, South African band Copperfield entered the local charts with their slowed-down, ballad interpretation of the song, which peaked at No. 2.

Popular culture
The song was included on the soundtrack for the 1997 British film, Metroland.

References

External links
 Hot Chocolate - So You Win Again from Discogs

1977 songs
1977 singles
Hot Chocolate (band) songs
Songs written by Russ Ballard
UK Singles Chart number-one singles
RAK Records singles
Big Tree Records singles
Song recordings produced by Mickie Most